Nightbreaker is the eighth studio album by American heavy metal band Riot. It was the band's first release with vocalist Mike DiMeo, as well as the studio debut of guitarist Mike Flyntz and bassist Pete Perez.

The album was released in Japan by Sony Music in 1993, in Europe by Rising Sun Productions in 1994, and finally re-issued in the United States by Metal Blade Records in 1999, all with different cover artwork. A very limited run of CDs, bearing the Combat Pay Music label and utilizing the Japanese artwork, was also produced in 1993 by the band's management.

"Burn" is a cover of the title track of Deep Purple's album of 1974; "A Whiter Shade of Pale" is a cover Procol Harum's hit single of 1967; "Outlaw" is a re-recorded song from Riot's 1981 album Fire Down Under.

Track listing

Japanese edition bonus track

1999 US edition bonus track 

Note:
 On the European Rising Sun Prod. pressing, "A Whiter Shade of Pale" is replaced with "I'm on the Run" (4:56)

Personnel

Band members
Mike DiMeo - vocals
Mark Reale - guitar, producer
Mike Flyntz - guitar
Pete Perez - bass
Bobby Jarzombek - drums

Production
Steve Loeb - producer, executive producer
Rod Hui - engineer, mixing

References

Riot V albums
1994 albums
Sony Music Entertainment Japan albums